Lois Jones may refer to:
 Lois Mailou Jones (1905–1998), artist
 Lois Jones (scientist) (1935–2000), Antarctic scientist

See also 
 Lewis Jones (disambiguation)
 Louise Jones (disambiguation)
 Louis Jones (disambiguation)